Sukhovolia may refer several places in Ukraine:

Sukhovolia, Chervonohrad Raion, Lviv Oblast, village in Chervonohrad Raion
Sukhovolia, Lviv Raion, Lviv Oblast, village in Lviv Raion
Sukhovolia, Zolochiv Raion, Lviv Oblast, village in Zolochiv Raion
Sukhovolia, Rivne Oblast, village in Varash Raion
Sukhovolia, Volyn Oblast, village in Lutsk Raion
Sukhovolia, Zviahel Raion, Zhytomyr Oblast, village in Zviahel Raion
Sukhovolia, Zhytomyr Raion, Zhytomyr Oblast, village in Zhytomyr Raion

See also
Suchowola (disambiguation)